J.B. Roy State Ayurvedic Medical College & Hospital is a ayurvedic medical college and hospital in Kolkata, West Bengal, India. It was established in 1916 and one of the oldest ayurvedic medical college in West Bengal. This ayurvedic college is affiliated with the West Bengal University of Health Sciences. This college is also recognized by the Ministry of Ayush, Government of India. It offers BAMS degree course.

References

External links

1916 establishments in India
Educational institutions established in 1916
Ayurveda hospitals
Hospitals established in 1916
Universities and colleges in Kolkata
Affiliates of West Bengal University of Health Sciences